General elections were held in Thailand on 18 April 1983. The result was a victory for the Social Action Party, which won 92 of the 324 seats. Voter turnout was 50.8%.

Results

References

Thailand
General election
Elections in Thailand
Election and referendum articles with incomplete results
General election